Arkadia is a village in the administrative district of Gmina Nieborów, within Łowicz County, Łódź Voivodeship, in central Poland.

The village has an approximate population of 250. The village is famous for its English Garden Park set up by Helena Radziwiłł in 1779 with the designers Szymon Bogumil Zug and Henryk Ittar.

References
 Central Statistical Office (GUS) Population: Size and Structure by Administrative Division – (2007-12-31) (in Polish)

Villages in Łowicz County